The list of provincial parks of Columbia-Shuswap Regional District contains the 24 provincial parks located within this regional district of the province of British Columbia. These parks are administered by BC Parks under the jurisdiction of the Ministry of Environment and Climate Change Strategy.

The most visited provincial park of this region is Shuswap Lake Provincial Park with 107,051 total visitors and 74,170 overnight campers during the 2017/2018 season.

List of parks

Gallery

References

External links 

Map of provincial parks in Columbia-Shuswap Regional District on env.gov.bc.ca

 
Provincial parks
British Columbia, Columbia-Shuswap
Provincial parks